Pat O'Brien (born May 17, 1965) is an American guitarist best known as the former lead guitarist for death metal band Cannibal Corpse, a former member of heavy metal band Nevermore, and as a live guitarist a few times with Slayer and now Exhorder.

Biography 
 was born in Northern Kentucky. He graduated from Conner High School in Hebron, Kentucky, in 1983 and currently resides in Tampa, Florida. His hobbies involve music and hunting.

 got his first guitar when he was 11. His mother bought him an acoustic guitar for Christmas. Later, when he started to practice more he received his first electric guitar, a Gibson SG copy. His father also bought him a 1974 Gibson Flying V. His influences include AC/DC, Black Sabbath, Deep Purple, Mercyful Fate and Metallica.

As a guitarist, O'Brien is formally trained, having studied classical guitar. He gave lessons at Buddy Rogers Music, a music store in Florence, Kentucky, and Maschinots Music in Southgate, KY,
where he encouraged his students to listen to jazz, classical, fusion, country and blues and not focus solely on metal. He recalls that his interest in classical guitar probably came from a concert of Andrés Segovia he attended with his father. Segovia remains O'Brien's favourite guitarist and his main inspiration.

Career 
 started playing in a series of bands, sometimes as a touring musician and sometimes as a full-time member. Throughout the 1980s he played in heavy metal bands such as Chastain and Prizoner. In the 1990s  evolved from heavy metal to death metal. Between 1990 and 1992 he played in the Cincinnati-based death/thrash metal band Ceremony alongside Steve Tucker, Greg Reed and Shannon Purdon. They released a demo in 1992 entitled Ceremony, and an EP called The Days before the Death that did not come out before 2000 and for which  did the mastering with Mark Prator. After the band's breakup,  decided to move out of Cincinnati. He relocated to Los Angeles and searched for a new band. Through tape trading he eventually got hired by Nevermore, who at the time were looking for a second guitarist.

 stayed in the band for two years during which they recorded the EP In Memory and the full-length The Politics of Ecstasy which both came out in 1996. He also toured with the band and took part in a video shoot for the song "What Tomorrow Knows" from Nevermore's eponymous debut album. However, he felt unsatisfied with the band, preferring to be involved in death metal. Following his departure from Nevermore,  went through a transitional period where he briefly joined Monstrosity as a touring member but remained somewhat inactive for the rest of the time. When asked about Nevermore years later he replied "I got kicked out of Nevermore because I wasn’t queer."

Cannibal Corpse 

In 1997 he was approached by Cannibal Corpse through several relations. After auditioning for the band,  ultimately became a permanent member replacing Rob Barrett. He has been featured on every Cannibal Corpse album since Gallery of Suicide up until Red Before Black when he officially parted ways of the band.

Since his involvement in Cannibal Corpse,  has been credited on some of the band's more technically complicated songs. One song which has been cited by other band members, both past and current, as the most difficult Cannibal Corpse song is "Frantic Disembowelment" from the album The Wretched Spawn. To this day the band has performed this song live only once.  has often been complimented by his co-members and other musicians in the death metal scene for his proficiency. In the documentary DVD Centuries of Torment: The First 20 Years bassist Alex Webster stated that "Some of his rhythm parts are as difficult as a solo might be in another band." Drummer Paul Mazurkiewicz commended his contribution to the band's music, stating "He really is a vital part of the Cannibal [Corpse] sound. His songs are awesome and we definitely need his songs on our CDs."

 himself admitted that he tends to write more technical songs but often regards it as a by-product of the songwriting process rather than an aim in itself. However unlike Webster and Mazurkiewicz,  does not take part in the composition of lyrics and instead focuses on the music.

Slayer 
In April 2011  filled in for Exodus' Gary Holt when Holt left the Slayer European tour to play with his own band. Holt himself had been filling in for the now deceased Slayer guitarist Jeff Hanneman since February 26, 2011, subsequently joining the band.

Guest appearances 
 made several guest appearances as lead guitarist. He collaborated on Leather's solo debut album Shock Waves which came out in 1989. He played lead on the track "Balancing Act" which came out as a bonus track for the 1997 re-issue of Lethal's "Your Favorite God" EP. In 2006 he played lead guitar on "Render My Prey" on Spawn of Possession's album Noctambulant. In 2008  played guitar on the song "Race Against Disaster" on Jeff Loomis's debut solo album Zero Order Phase. In the same year he made a guest solo appearance on Kataklysm's album Prevail.

Assault incident 
On December 10, 2018, O'Brien was arrested in Tampa for burglary of a house in the 4700 block of Windflower Circle near the Northdale Golf and Country and for assault on a responding deputy. Reports showed that around 6:57 p.m., he entered a home without permission from its two unidentified occupants. After one occupant told him to leave, O'Brien pushed a woman to the ground, left the house and hid in the property's backyard until police arrived. A responding deputy gave him orders; instead of complying,  charged at the deputy with a knife. The deputy then tased him, taking him into custody afterward. He was booked into the Hillsborough County Sheriff's Office on charges of burglary with assault or battery and aggravated assault on a law enforcement officer, and was being held without bail. The burglarized home is in the same area of a golf course as where a house fire broke out about the same time at 16311 Norwood Dr., the house O'Brien was renting. It was not immediately clear if the fire was connected to his arrest.

At O'Brien's court appearance on the morning of December 11, he wore an anti-suicide vest with his wrists and ankles chained together. His bail was set at $50,000 and was told by a judge that he would need to pass a drug test to see if he could be bonded out of jail. O'Brien could face up to 30 years in prison just on the charge of aggravated assault on a law enforcement officer with a deadly weapon. The burglary charge could see a fine of up to $10,000 and a maximum of life in prison.

Flamethrowers, numerous weapons and ammunition that had caught fire and exploded were recovered inside O'Brien's home. One neighbor said that he seemed "just like a regular neighbor. Get out of the car, go right into the house. That's about it." Another neighbor was terrified by the incident, but was thankful that the fire crew came in time to put the flames out before spreading to other homes.

A crowdfunding campaign for O'Brien was launched by drummer Paul Mazurkiewicz's then-wife Deana. She stated that he "does not have insurance, and lost everything that he owns. These funds will help him get back on his feet with the regular much-needed necessities like clothing, a roof over his head, and other daily life necessities that are needed."

O'Brien was released from jail on December 14, 2018, after posting bond. The day after the fire subsided, fire marshals found a massive amount of weapons, locked safes and potential explosive devices in O'Brien's possession. The list of weapons found included 50 shotguns, ten semi-automatic rifles (including several variants of AK-47s), two Uzi-style rifles and 20 handguns. Other materials found were a number of locked safes, two flamethrowers, thousands of rounds of ammunition that were stored in boxes, several other weapons with their parts and three skulls. One of the weapons was illegal to possess, a sawed-off shotgun. The search warrant that was issued did not state if O'Brien had paperwork for his cache.

Cannibal Corpse expressed their respects for O'Brien, but would not release any further information regarding the incident, and that he "is getting the help he needs and appreciates the love and support from Cannibal Corpse fans around the world." They then said that O'Brien is looking forward to a future return to the band and that their tours and shows would continue as planned. In 2021 Erik Rutan from Hate Eternal officially became the new guitar player for Cannibal Corpse.

Cannibal Corpse vocalist George "Corpsegrinder" Fisher spoke out and said that he was shocked to hear about O'Brien's arrest and that the fans have expressed their support for him. He also said that he broke down upon seeing him in court wearing the anti-suicide vest, and that the band expressed their support for him as well.

On March 16, 2021, O'Brien was sentenced to 150 hours of community service, $23,793.45 restitution, a 5-year probation with alcohol and drug evaluation and treatment, and time served.

Equipment 
O'Brien plays mostly Jackson Custom Shop V's (as of 2017) which are equipped with a Fishman Fluence Modern pickup in the bridge position and a Floyd Rose bridge. When on tour, he takes four guitars, one for the different tunings and a spare. In Cannibal Corpse  currently uses two tunings: A# standard and G# standard.  Both companies have released their respective Pat  signature model. Throughout his career  has always preferred to use V shaped guitars. Other guitars included in his collection are:
B.C. Rich JR V (damaged during the house fire but was restored)
B.C. Rich King V (damaged during the house fire but was restored)
RAN Invader. (green camo one got destroyed)
(Older Guitars Used)
B.C. Rich JR V 7 string, (destroyed)
B.C. Rich JR V baritone, (destroyed)
Gibson Flying V (1974, 1979 and 1981), (destroyed)
Jackson Randy Rhoads, (destroyed)
Jackson Custom Shop Double Rhoads V (destroyed)
Jackson Custom Shop King V (destroyed)
For amplification  uses Mesa Boogie Triple Rectifier (2 channel) amplifier heads with 4x12 cabinets, some of which are loaded with Celestion Vintage 30 speakers and others which are loaded with Electro-Voice EVM12L Black Label Zakk Wylde speakers. He also uses a number of effect pedals such as a Robert Keeley modified Boss MT-2 Metal Zone, ISP Technologies Decimator Noise Reduction, Dunlop Crybaby Wah and a Boss Octaver.

Discography 
Ceremony
 1991 – untitled/unreleased (Demo)
 1992 – Ceremony (Demo)
 2000 – The Days Before the Death (EP)

with Nevermore
 1996 – In Memory (EP)
 1996 – The Politics of Ecstasy

with Cannibal Corpse
 1998 – Gallery of Suicide
 1999 – Bloodthirst
 2002 – Gore Obsessed
 2004 – The Wretched Spawn
 2006 – Kill
 2009 – Evisceration Plague
 2012 – Torture
 2014 – A Skeletal Domain
 2017 – Red Before Black

Guest session 
Jeff Loomis
 2008 – Zero Order Phase

Kataklysm
 2008 – Prevail

Leather
 1989 – Shock Waves

Lethal
 1997 – Your Favorite God (EP)

Spawn of Possession
 2006 – Noctambulant

Intimidation
 2016 – "Throne of Influence" (Spiritual Thrashing EP)

References

External links 
 Cannibal Corpse main website

20th-century American guitarists
Cannibal Corpse members
Chastain (band) members
Death metal musicians
American heavy metal guitarists
Guitarists from Kentucky
Lead guitarists
Living people
People from Hebron, Kentucky
Rock musicians from Kentucky
Songwriters from Kentucky
Nevermore members
Year of birth uncertain
1965 births